Pueblo Grande may refer to:

Pueblo Grande Ruin and Irrigation Sites, an archaeological site and park in Phoenix, Arizona
Pueblo Grande de Nevada, an archaeological site near Overton, Nevada